Adi Tekelezan (in Tigrinya, ዓዲ ተከሌዛን in Tigre and Arabic, عدي تيكلزان) is a small town in the Hamasien region of Eritrea. It is located on the route between Asmara and Keren. Adi Tekelezan is 42 km away from Asmera, it take 47 minute by car to arrived. A local commercial center, it has a population of around 4,000 inhabitants. 

Anseba Region
Populated places in Eritrea